The Arts Club is a London private members' club founded in 1863 by, among others, Charles Dickens, Anthony Trollope, and Lord Leighton in Dover Street, Mayfair. It remains a meeting place for men and women involved in the creative arts either professionally or as patrons.

History
In the nineteenth century members and guests included Dickens, Millais, Whistler, Kipling, Monet, Rodin, Degas and Turgenev. As early as 1891, James Whistler, one of the Arts Club's leading members, broke away to found the rival Chelsea Arts Club.

Clubhouse 
The original club premises were at 17 Hanover Square, Mayfair. After thirty years there, the club moved nearby to its current accommodation, an 18th-century townhouse at 40 Dover Street, Mayfair, just north of the Ritz Hotel on Piccadilly, formerly the London home of the family of the Baron Stanley of Alderley. It was badly bombed in the Blitz and extensively rebuilt. In December 2020 the club opened its first international outpost in Dubai in the ICD Brookfield Place building, Ajaz Sheikh was named CEO of the Dubai Arts Club.

Membership

Current membership includes a number of Royal Academicians, architects, musicians, actors and writers. HRH Prince Philip, Duke of Edinburgh was the Patron and Sir Peter Blake is the President of the Club. The Chairman of the Club is Arjun C Waney OBE. Current members include Grayson Perry, the photographer Tom Hunter, the actresses Gwyneth Paltrow and Kim Cattrall and also Ronnie Wood. Well known "non-artist" members include Richard Attenborough, Matthew Parris, and Henry Blofeld.

As of 2012, the Club has no reciprocal clubs in the UK.  However, a number of clubs outside the UK of similar character have reciprocal arrangements, including the Cercle de l'Union interalliée in Paris, The Arts and Letters Club of Toronto, the St. Botolph and Algonquin Clubs in Boston, the Cosmos Club in Washington DC, the Arts Club of Chicago and the Arts Club of Washington DC, and the Century Association, The Coffee House, National Arts Club and Salmagundi Club in New York.

References

Further reading
Rogers, G. A. F. The Arts Club and its members (London: Truslove and Hanson, 1920).

External links

1863 establishments in the United Kingdom
British artist groups and collectives
Arts in the United Kingdom
Buildings and structures in the City of Westminster
Gentlemen's clubs in London
Mayfair
Arts organizations established in the 1860s